Cambodia and Spain share bilateral and diplomatic relations. Cambodia does not have embassy in Spain, but the embassy in Paris is accredited for this country. There is no diplomatic delegation from Spain in Cambodia. The Spanish Embassy is located in Bangkok, Thailand.

Diplomatic relations 
Spain established diplomatic relations with Cambodia on May 3, 1977. Diplomatic contacts between the two countries have been cordial. In recent years, our relations have focused on the framework of EU and Asem. The most prominent field has been development cooperation.

There is a Spanish interest in the consolidation of democracy in Cambodia, respect for human rights, justice, the environment, gender equality and the fight against trafficking in women. Until 2012, an Ambassador in Special Mission with residence in Phnom Penh was in charge of channeling contacts. Currently, the Spanish embassy in Bangkok is the one accredited to the Government of Cambodia. The Consular Section of the Embassy in Bangkok, supported by the French Embassy in Phnom Penh, ensures consular benefits for Spaniards residing in Cambodia.

Economic relations 
Trade relations between the two countries are reduced and unbalanced in favor of Cambodia. Imports have grown by 63% since 2009, while exports have grown by 61%, although the latter have been based on reduced figures.

The penetration of the Cambodian market by Spanish companies is low, although it has increased during the last years by companies in the clothing sector that manufacture or buy in Cambodia, which explains the bulky trade deficit.

Cooperation 
In 2010, the OTC of the AECID was opened in Cambodia, with residence in Phnom Penh, for the follow-up of the programs developed by international organizations, UN agencies and NGOs with funding from the AECID. The OTC closed in early 2014.

See also
 Foreign relations of Cambodia 
 Foreign relations of Spain

References 

 
Spain
Cambodia